Robert Singleton (died 1544), also known as John, was an English Roman Catholic priest, executed on a treason charge. He is considered a Catholic martyr by Antonio Possevino, in his Apparatus Sacer.

Life
He belonged to a Lancashire family and was educated at the University of Oxford, but does not appear to have graduated. He became a priest, and for some utterances which were accounted treasonable was brought before a court of bishops in 1543. He was executed at Tyburn on 7 March 1544, along with Germain Gardiner and John Larke.

Works
He is said to have written:

Treatise of the Seven Churches
Of the Holy Ghost
Comment on Certain Prophecies
Theory of the Earth, dedicated to Henry VII. Thomas Tanner calls this Of the Seven Ages of the World.

None seem to have been printed.

References

Year of birth missing
1544 deaths
16th-century English Roman Catholic priests
English martyrs